Sphaerostylus is a genus of beetles in the family Carabidae, containing the following species:

 Sphaerostylus acutangulus (Jeannel, 1946) 
 Sphaerostylus alluaudi (Jeannel, 1946) 
 Sphaerostylus bimaculatus H.Kolbe, 1895 
 Sphaerostylus brevipennis (Jeannel, 1946) 
 Sphaerostylus ditomoides (Brulle, 1835) 
 Sphaerostylus feai (Basilewsky, 1949) 
 Sphaerostylus goryi (Castelnau, 1834) 
 Sphaerostylus guineensis Alluaud, 1925 
 Sphaerostylus insularis (Basilewsky, 1949) 
 Sphaerostylus levis (Jeannel, 1946) 
 Sphaerostylus longipennis 
 Sphaerostylus luteus (Hope, 1842) 
 Sphaerostylus punctutostriatus Chaudoir, 1867
 Sphaerostylus striatus 
 Sphaerostylus vadoni (Jeannel, 1946)

References

Paussinae
Carabidae genera